The Speed of Light (originally published in Spanish as La velocidad de la luz) is the fifth book of narrative Spanish writer Javier Cercas. The novel was first published in March 2005 by Tusquets Editores. The book was translated into English by Anne McLean, then published by Bloomsbury in 2006. In 2008, it was shortlisted for the International Dublin Literary Award.
The book discusses a friendship with a Vietnam War veteran.

References

External links

2005 novels
Novels set in Barcelona
21st-century Spanish novels